Ditte Christiane Jensen (born 25 October 1980 in Birkerød, Hovedstaden) is a former freestyle swimmer from Denmark, who represented her country at the 1996 Summer Olympics in Atlanta, Georgia.

A member of swimming club Idrætsforeningen Skjold she is best known for winning the bronze medal at the 1997 European Championships (LC) in the women's 4×200 m freestyle, alongside Britt Raaby, Berit Puggaard, and Mette Jacobsen. She was the youngest member (15 years, 271 days) of the Danish delegation at the 1996 Summer Olympics.

References
sports-reference

1980 births
Living people
Danish female swimmers
Olympic swimmers of Denmark
Swimmers at the 1996 Summer Olympics
Danish female freestyle swimmers
European Aquatics Championships medalists in swimming
People from Rudersdal Municipality
Sportspeople from the Capital Region of Denmark